John Bailey Jones (March 30, 1927 – January 30, 2023) was a United States district judge of the United States District Court for the District of South Dakota.

Early life, education, and career
Born in Mitchell, South Dakota, Jones was in the United States Naval Reserve from 1945 to 1947. He received a Bachelor of Science degree from the University of South Dakota in 1951 and a Bachelor of Laws from the University of South Dakota School of Law in 1953. He was in private practice in Presho, South Dakota from 1953 to 1966. He was a county judge of Lyman County, South Dakota from 1953 to 1956. He was a South Dakota state representative from 1956 to 1960. He was a circuit judge of the South Dakota Tenth Judicial Circuit from 1967 to 1974. He was a circuit judge of the South Dakota Sixth Judicial Circuit from 1974 to 1981.

Federal judicial service
On October 20, 1981, Jones was nominated by President Ronald Reagan to a seat on the United States District Court for the District of South Dakota vacated by Judge Fred Joseph Nichol. Jones was confirmed by the United States Senate on November 18, 1981, and received his commission the same day. He served as chief judge from 1991 to 1994. He assumed senior status on January 1, 1995.

Personal life and death
Jones died in Sioux Falls, South Dakota, on January 30, 2023, at the age of 95.

References

Sources
 

1927 births
2023 deaths
20th-century American judges
21st-century American judges
Judges of the United States District Court for the District of South Dakota
Members of the South Dakota House of Representatives
Military personnel from South Dakota
People from Mitchell, South Dakota
People from Presho, South Dakota
South Dakota state court judges
United States district court judges appointed by Ronald Reagan
United States Navy personnel of World War II
United States Navy reservists
University of South Dakota alumni
University of South Dakota School of Law alumni